Bab Jazira Mosque also known as El Jenaïz mosque is a mosque in Tunis, Tunisia.

Localization 
This mosque is Located in the Sidi Bashir arrondissement, in Al Jazira square.

History 
It was built in 1710 by Cheikh Yahia Esslimani. The minarets were restored in 1907.

References

Mosques in Tunis
Religious buildings and structures completed in 1710
18th-century mosques
1710 establishments in the Ottoman Empire